Lyces is a genus of moths of the family Notodontidae erected by Francis Walker in 1854. It consists of the following species:

Lyces andosa (Druce, 1911)
Lyces angulosa Walker, 1854
Lyces annulata (Dognin, 1909)
Lyces ariaca (Druce, 1885)
Lyces attenuata J.S. Miller, 2009
Lyces aurimutua Walker, 1854
Lyces banana (Warren, 1901)
Lyces constricta (Warren, 1901)
Lyces cruciata (Butler, 1875)
Lyces ena (Boisduval, 1870)
Lyces enoides Boisduval, 1870
Lyces eterusialis Walker, 1864
Lyces flavissima Walker, 1854
Lyces fluonia (Druce, 1885)
Lyces fornax Druce, 1885
Lyces gopala (Dognin, 1891)
Lyces ignorata (Hering, 1925)
Lyces latistriga (Hering, 1925)
Lyces longistria (Warren, 1904)
Lyces minuta (Druce, 1885)
Lyces patula (Walker, 1864)
Lyces solaris (Schaus, 1892)
Lyces striata (Druce, 1885)
Lyces tamara (Hering, 1925)
Lyces vulturata (Warren, 1904)

References

Notodontidae